"Dragon Slayer" is a song written and performed by American comedy rock band Ninja Sex Party. The song was originally recorded for the band's third studio album Attitude City. The track was released as the band's sixth single on February 19, 2014, becoming the second single to be released in promotion of Attitude City.

Packaging
The single cover for "Dragon Slayer" was painted by London-based artist Katie Scott. The artwork, originally posted by Scott on her Facebook page in November 2013, features Danny Sexbang sitting on a dragon corpse, holding a bloodied sword with two half-naked girls sitting at his feet. Ninja Brian stands in the background holding a pocket knife. She had previously created the artwork for British alternative rock band Bombay Bicycle Club's third studio album A Different Kind of Fix.

Music video
The music video for "Dragon Slayer", directed by Game Grumps co-host Arin Hanson, and featuring cameo appearances from Hanson, Game Grumps editor Barry Kramer, Steam Train co-host Ross O'Donovan, and internet personality Comic Book Girl 19 premiered on YouTube on February 21, 2014.

The video broke the threshold of 1 million views in June 2014, becoming the sixth music video by the band to have achieved such. The video is the fifth  most viewed upload on the channel, with over 7 million views as of June 2019.

Track listings

Personnel
Ninja Sex Party
Dan Avidan – vocals
Brian Wecht – keyboards, production

Charts

Release history

References

2014 singles
2014 songs
Comedy songs
Ninja Sex Party songs